Young Epidemiology Scholars (YES) is a United States scholarship program in the area of public health.  It is sponsored by the Robert Wood Johnson Foundation and administered by the College Board.

Goals 
The program's goal is to inspire students to do epidemiology research, and to inspire students to explore the broad field of public health.  Such research can involve many different topics, including disease, social networking, methods of health education, sports injuries, obesity, stress, and sleeping patterns.

Awards 
The program offers up to 120 scholarships each year, for a total award amount of $456,000.  All students entering submit their paper to the program no later than the beginning of February.  Of all submissions:
 60 Semifinalists are chosen and given a $1000 scholarship.
 60 Finalists, 10 from each region of the country, are chosen to compete at a higher level.  They receive an expense paid trip to the entire national competition in Washington, D.C.

In Washington 

At the regional finals level, the 60 finalists are also judged by a presentation to a group of judges, as well as a question and answer session.  Of all the regional finalists,
 48 (8 of each region) receive a $2000 scholarship.
 12 (2 of each region) are selected at National Finalists

The National Finalists then present again to a national panel in the same format as before. Awards for the national finalists are as follows.
 6 awards of $15,000.
 2 awards of $20,000.
 2 awards of $35,000.
 2 awards of $50,000.

First place winners

Most recent (2010–2011)

Michelle Lee of North Allegheny Senior High School in Wexford, PA for "Routine Outpatient Testing of Skin Infections for Methicillin-Resistant Staphylococcus Aureus (MRSA) in High School Athletes"
Rebecca Leong of Columbia River High School in Vancouver, WA for "The Effect of Footwear Habits of Long-Distance Runners on Running-Related Injury: A Prospective Cohort"

2009–2010

Shoshanna Goldin of Moravian Academy in Bethlehem, PA for "Energy Epidemic: Teen Perceptions and Consumption of Energy Drinks"
Gazelle Zerafati of The Baldwin School in Bryn Mawr, PA for "Epidemiology of Migraine in Teenage Girls, A Student Population Based Study"

2008–2009

Alexander Chernyakhovsky of William Mason High School in Mason, OH for "Global Epidemiological Analysis of Avian Influenza Viruses in Humans"
Amrita Sehgal of Menlo-Atherton High School in Atherton, CA for "Can We Start the War on Osteoporosis Early? Are Teenagers Taking Enough Calcium?"

2007–2008

Katie Everett of Huron High School in Ann Arbor, MI for "A Sexual-Network-Based Model Evaluating the Impact of Human Papillomavirus Vaccination on Infection Prevalence in an Adolescent Population"
Jessica Palmer of Ossining High School in Ossining, NY for "Examining Repetitive Behaviors in Parents and Siblings of Individuals with Autism"

2006–2007

Megan Blewett of Madison High School in Madison, NJ for "A Space/Time Epidemiological Comparison of Multiple Sclerosis and Amyotrophic Sclerosis" 
William Slack of Decatur High School in Decatur, GA for "Teen Drug, Alcohol, and Tobacco Use: A social network examination"

2005–2006

Natalia Nazarewicz of Oak Ridge High School in Oak Ridge, TN for "Deliberate Self-Harm Among Adolescents: Prevalence, Risk Factors, and Treatment Options"
Aman Prasad of Century High School in Pocatello, ID for "Physical Activity and Mood in Adolescents"

2004–2005

Jessica Cohen of Roslyn High School in Roslyn Heights, NY for "The Impact of Condom Education on High School Students"
Andreea Seicean of Bay High School in Bay Village, OH for "A Significant Association Between Short Sleeping Hours and Teens Overweight/Obesity: Results from Bay High School"

2003–2004

Benjamin Eidelson of Akiba Hebrew Academy in Merion Station, PA for "VIR-POX: An Epidemiologic Study of Smallpox Preparedness and Response Policy"
Robert Levine of Adlai E. Stevenson High School in Lincolnshire, IL for "Artificial Tanning by Suburban Teenagers: A Survey on the Prevalence of and Motivations for Indoor Tanning in the Midwest"

Sponsoring organizations 
 The College Board
 The Robert Wood Johnson Foundation

Public health in the United States